Kaiping District is a district of Tangshan, Hebei, China.

Administrative divisions

Subdistricts:
Kaiping Subdistrict, Doudian Subdistrict, Jinggezhuang Subdistrict, Majiagou Subdistrict, Shuiwuzhuang Subdistrict

Towns:
Kaiping Town, Liyuan, Zhengzhuangzi Town, Shuangqiao Town, Wali Town, Yuehe Town

References

External links

County-level divisions of Hebei
Tangshan